The label Nationalist Conservative was used by several Quebec Members of the House of Commons of Canada (MPs) and several unsuccessful candidates.  They used this label in order to distinguish themselves from the British imperialist reputation of the Conservative Party or as a result of disputes with the party.

The three MPs were first elected in the nineteenth century when the term nationalism in Quebec referred to Canadian nationalism, as opposed to British imperialism or a desire for an independent Quebec.

See also
 List of political parties in Canada

Federal political parties in Canada
Defunct political parties in Canada
Conservative Party of Canada (1867–1942)
Canadian nationalism